Black twig is a type of an apple

Black twig may refer to:

 Black Twig, Finnish musical band
 Black Twig Pickers, an Appalachian old-time band